Lateral collateral ligament can refer to:
 Fibular collateral ligament, a ligament in the knee
 Lateral collateral ligament of ankle joint
 Radial collateral ligament of elbow joint